Arlecdon and Frizington is a civil parish in the Borough of Copeland in Cumbria, England. The parish had a population of 3,678 in the 2001 census, decreasing to 3,607 at the 2011 census.

The parish includes Arlecdon, Frizington, Rowrah and Asby. It constituted an urban district from 1894.

In 1919 John Adams led a successful election challenge to the sitting members of Arlecdon and Frizington District Council. This established the first all-Labour council to be elected in England. Adams held the office of Chairman of the Arlecdon and Frizington Urban District Council from 1919 to 1923.

In 1934, it became part of Ennerdale Rural District, which was later subsumed in 1974 into Copeland Borough Council.

Governance
Arlecdon and Frizington is within the Copeland UK Parliamentary constituency. Trudy Harrison is the Member of parliament.

Before Brexit, it was in the North West England European Parliamentary Constituency.

The Parish Council is named Arlecdon & Frizington Parish Council.

The parish falls in the electoral ward of Arlecdon. This ward stretches south to Weddicar and has a total population taken at the 2011 census of 1,500.

See also

Listed buildings in Arlecdon and Frizington
John Adams, 1st Baron Adams

References

External links
  Cumbria County History Trust: Arlecdon (nb: provisional research only - see Talk page)

Civil parishes in Cumbria
Borough of Copeland